Serge Lancel (5 September 1928 – 9 October 2005) was a French archaeologist, historian and philologist.

Publications 
 Tipasa de Maurétanie, éd. Ministère de l’Éducation nationale, Algiers, 1966
 Verrerie antique de Tipasa, éd. De Bocard, Paris, 1967
 Actes de la conférence de Carthage en 411, 4 tomes, coll. Sources chrétiennes, éd. du Cerf, Paris, 1972-1991
 [sous la dir.] Byrsa I. Mission archéologique française à Carthage, éd. INAA, Tunis / éd. École française de Rome, Rome, 1979
 [sous la dir.] Byrsa II. Mission archéologique française à Carthage, éd. INAA, Tunis / éd. École française de Rome, Rome, 1982  
 Introduction à la connaissance de Carthage. La colline de Byrsa à l'époque punique, éd. Recherches sur les civilisations, 1983
 Carthage, Paris, éd. Fayard, 1992 
 Hannibal, Paris, éd. Fayard, 1995 
 Saint Augustin, Paris, éd. Fayard, 1999 
 Pax et concordia : chrétiens des premiers siècles en Algérie (IIIe}-VIIe siècles) with Paul Mattei, éd. Marsa, Paris, 2001
 L'Algérie antique. De Massinissa à saint Augustin, éd. Mengès, Paris, 2003 
 Une saison en Numidie, éd. Tchou, Paris, 2007

References 

People from Havana
1928 births
2005 deaths
École Normale Supérieure alumni
French archaeologists
French philologists
Chevaliers of the Légion d'honneur
Knights of the Ordre national du Mérite
Officiers of the Ordre des Palmes Académiques
Chevaliers of the Ordre des Arts et des Lettres
20th-century archaeologists
20th-century philologists